Mishima (written:  or ) is a Japanese surname. Notable people with the surname include:

 Dokonjonosuke Mishima (born 1972), Japanese mixed martial artist
, Japanese philosopher
, Japanese footballer
 Mishima Michitsune (1835–1888), viscount and statesman of the Tokugawa shogunate
 Michiharu Mishima (1897–1965), viscount of the Scout Association of Japan, Chief Scout of Japan
, Japanese footballer
 Yukio Mishima (1925–1970), the penname of Kimitake Hiraoka, a Japanese novelist and playwright

Fictional characters 
 Heihachi Mishima, a Tekken character
 Jinpachi Mishima, a Tekken character
 Kazumi Mishima, a Tekken character
 Kazumi Mishima (三島 和己), a character from Your Turn To Die
 Kazuya Mishima, a Tekken character

References

Japanese-language surnames